Ron Dean (born August 15, 1938) is an American film and television actor. He appeared in films including Rudy, Risky Business, The Breakfast Club, Cocktail, The Babe, The Fugitive, The Client, and The Dark Knight. He is known for often playing detectives and other law-enforcement characters, most notably as Det. Marion Zeke Crumb in the fantasy comedy-drama television series Early Edition.

Dean attended DeKalb School of the Arts.

Select filmography

Film

Television

References

External links

American male film actors
American male television actors
Living people
20th-century American male actors
21st-century American male actors
Place of birth missing (living people)
1938 births